Kurbanlı can refer to:

 Kurbanlı, Çat
 Kurbanlı, Tarsus